Annibale Berton (8 March 1936 – 30 December 2004) was an Italian sprint canoer who competed in the early 1960s. At the 1960 Summer Olympics in Rome, he was eliminated in the semifinals of the K-1 4 × 500 m event.

References
Annibale Berton's profile at Sports Reference.com
Report on Italian Olympic canoeists 

1936 births
2004 deaths
Canoeists at the 1960 Summer Olympics
Italian male canoeists
Olympic canoeists of Italy